Benfeld (Alsatian: Banfald ) is a commune in the Bas-Rhin department in Grand Est in northeastern France. It is situated on the river Ill. In the nearby hamlet Ehl there is an archaeological site with the remains of the Gallo-Roman city Ellelum or Helvetum. Benfeld station has rail connections to Strasbourg and Colmar.

Population

Sights

The core of the town boasts a number of ancient buildings, chief among them the Renaissance town hall with its 1619 automata. The handsome 1846 synagogue survived the Nazi occupation.

See also
Communes of the Bas-Rhin department

References

Communes of Bas-Rhin
Bas-Rhin communes articles needing translation from French Wikipedia